Cross Lake (Charlie Sinclair Memorial) Airport  is located  east of Cross Lake, Manitoba, Canada.

Airlines and destinations

References

External links
Page about this airport on COPA's Places to Fly airport directory

Certified airports in Manitoba